Yaaradi Nee Mohini ( Who Are You, Ghost) is an Indian Tamil-language thriller soap opera starring Shreekumar, Nachathira, and Chaitra Reddy. It airs Monday through Saturday and was broadcast on 24 April 2017 on Zee Tamil and ended on 22 August 2021 by crossing 1200 episodes. It is available to stream on ZEE5. The show claimed to be the second-highest budgeted series on South Indian television. and it is the second longest serial of Zee Tamil after Sembaruthi.

Plot
Mutharasan is the grandson of a rich landlord. After his mother dies, his father Thanikachalam marries Neelambari. Mutharasan trusts and respects Neelambari not knowing that she is plotting to kill him. Meanwhile, his cousin Vennila loves him and wants to marry him. Neelambari secretly plots against him to acquire his father's property for her children; however, a clause in the will forbids her, as it says Mutharasan's wife must sign. Neelambari brings her niece Swetha to marry Muthu and supports her. Meanwhile, the ghost of Chitra (Mutharasan's dead wife) is out to spoil Neelambari's evil designs. After a few days Neelambari and her gang find it is the spirit of Chitra who spoils their plan.

Swetha plans to marry Mutharasan by hook or by crook. She murders Vennila's mother and grandmother, after which she gets engaged to Mutharasan. Swetha's ex-husband Yuvaraj comes to stop the marriage. Swetha discovers this and plans to kill Mutharasan's father. Now Vennila becomes too lonely as everyone who supported her is dead.

Here comes a clever character Kalai, wife of Maruthu (Neelambari's first son) who finds power of Chitra and stand along with Vennila. Maruthu later causes an accident to kill Kalai but she slips into a coma. Chitra's mother appears to reveal the truth to Mutharasan, but later gets killed by Neelambari. Later, Mutharasan takes a liking to Ruthra and adopts her. Mutharasan does not know that Ruthra is his daughter and mistakenly believes she is an orphan, though Ruthra knows it from her grandmother, Sumangali. Swetha plans to separate Ruthra and Vennila from Mutharasan. In a series of events, Mutharasan identifies the true caring nature of Vennila and how people in the house are taking advantages of her and stands beside her in all her problems.

A priest informs Mutharasan that he has a biological child born by Chitra before her death. In an attempt to know his child, he climbs the "Siddhar Malai" and gets to know that Ruthra is his daughter. When he returns, Ruthra is abducted by a family  who claim that Ruthra is the daughter of Pasupathi and Chitra. Mutharasan doesn't believe this, but is attacked by them and hospitalised. In a series of events, the members who claimed Ruthra are killed by divine interventions and forces. Eventually Vennila brings a herb from "Siddhar Malai" and cures Mutharasan's ailment. The story now moves ahead to unveil how Mutharasan finds out the true colors of his family. Neelambari fixed Mutharasan marriage with Swetha but Mutharasan married Vennila with all revenges and problems aired by Swetha and Swetha is admitted to hospital for treatment. Now she is cured and returns to take revenge against Vennila again.

Cast

Main
 Shreekumar (2018–2021) as Mutharasan (Muthu / Muthu Mama): He is rich, kind-hearted, and helpful. He has a small love with Vennila although he is supposed to marry Swetha. He is the father of his long-lost daughter Ruthra and husband of Chitra (ghost) and Vennila (2018–2021).
 Nachathira as Vennila / Appu: Mutharasan's love interest and second wife. She is famous in her village for her spiritual prayers and loves her cousin Mutharasan. Finally she married Mutharasan against all the struggles done by Swetha. (2017–2021)
 Chaitra Reddy as Swetha: Neelambari's brother Karunakaran's daughter, a cruel lady who wants to take over Neelambari's family's wealth by marrying Mutharasan's former elder love interest. Although all her plans had failed due to Chitra's ghost and circumstances, she takes revenge against Vennila, Gowtham , Janani, Karthick, Simran, Kalai and Mutharasan. (2017–2021)
 Yamuna Chinnadurai as Chitra: Mutharasan's first wife and mother of Ruthra. She was killed by Neelambari and Karunakaran in a fire accident and became a ghost. Now as a ghost she safeguards Mutharasan, Vennila, Gowtham , Karthik, Simran, Kalai and Janani whilst frightening Swetha and Neelambari. (2017–2021)
 Fathima Babu as Neelambari: She wants Mutharasan to marry Swetha to get his all properties but her plans failed. Now she takes revenge against Vennila. She was Mutharasan's stepmother and Marudhu, Poongodhai, Janani, and Karthick's mother. Later she died in Kasi due to heavy rain and flood. (2017–2021) (died in serial)

Supporting
 Barath as Marudhu: Neelambari's first son (2017–2021)
 Vinitha (2018–2021) as Kalai: Neelambari's daughter-in-law, Vennila's friend and Marudhu's wife 
 Murali Krish as Annamalai: Mutharasan's childhood friend (2019–2021)
 Magima Devi as Rani: Neelambari's sister (2017–2019)
 Minnal Deepa as Poongodhai: Neelambari's first daughter (2017–2021)
 Aravind Khathare as Dr. Azhagappan: Poongodhai's husband (2017–2021)
 Shalini Rajan (2020–2021) as Janani: Neelambari's second daughter 
 Surjith Ansary as Gowtham: Janani's husband (2019–2021)
 Bavithran (2019–2021) as Karthick: Neelambari's second son
 Dhanalakshmi (2020–2021) as Simran: Karthick's wife 
 Jenithra in a dual role as 
 Ruthra (Adult): Mutharasan and Chitra's daughter (2020–2021)
 Uthra: A poor girl, Ruthra's enemy, later became friend (2021)
 Manikandaraj Major as Veera: Neelambari's elder brother (2019–2021)
 Vijay Lokesh as Gokula Krishnan: Azhagappan's fake cousin brother, Vennila's cousin and Swetha's fiancé (2020–2021)

Special appearances
 Madhan Pandian
 Subalakshmi Rangan  
 Siddharth Kumaran
 Ashwin Karthick
 VJ Kathir
 Archana Chandhoke
 Zaara Vineeth
 Kousalya Senthamarai
 "Saregamapa" Ramani Ammal

Past
 Sanjeev (2017–2018) as Mutharasan (replaced by Shreekumar)
 Lisha as Ruthra (2018–2020): The long-lost daughter of Mutharasan was rescued by her grandmother and lived with Mutharasan's family doctor for the first nine years of her life. She reunites with Mutharasan and his family (replaced by Jenithra).
 Shyam (2018) as Yuvaraj: Swetha's first husband 
 VJ Mounika as Varsha: one of Swetha's cousins who comes to take revenge (2019)
 VJ Sasikala Nagarajan as Nandhini: Gowtham's sister (2019)
 Egavalli as Ghost Mohini: a negative ghost who went to separate Vennila and Mutharasan (cameo) (2020)
 Akshaya Kimmy as Akshaya: Swetha's friend (2019–2020)
 Kiruthika as Pooja: Simran's sister (2019–2020)
 Ranjith Babu as Ashok: Pooja's husband (2019–2020)
 Sree as Nikhila: Swetha's friend (2019–2020)
 Sairatheya as Swetha's mother (2017–2019)
 Sreenidhi Sudarshan (2019–2020) as Janani: Neelambari's daughter (replaced by Shalini Rajan)
 Pooja (2018–2019) as Janani: Neelambari's daughter (replaced by Sreenidhi Sudarshan)
 Jeeva Rajendran (2018–2019) as Karthick: Neelambari's son (replaced by Bavithran)
 Nivisha Kingkon (2017–2018) as Janani: Neelambari's daughter (replaced by Pooja)
 Haris Athitya (2017–2018) as Karthick: Neelambari's son (replaced by Jeeva)
 Gayathri (2017–2018) as Kalai: Neelambari's daughter-in-law, wife of Marudhu (replaced by Vinitha)
 Akila Krishnan as Roshini: A beautician who helps Vennila from Swetha (2020)
 Tejas Gowda (2018) as Yuvaraj: Swetha's first husband (replaced by Shyam)
 Ravishankar as Mutharasan's family doctor who cares for Ruthra from childhood (2019)
 P. R. Varalakshmi as Kulangini: Killed by Swetha (2019)
 VJ Sharanya as Swetha's friend (2017–2018)
 Hensha Deepan as Deepa: Swetha's friend (2018–2020)
 Sivanya Priyanka as Swetha's friend (2018–2019)
 Tharani as Swetha's friend (2018–2020)
 Raj Mithran as powerful exorcist: Joined Swetha to destroy the ghost Chitra (2017–2018)
 Munish Rajan as Shanmugam: Mutharasan's friend (2017–2018)
 Vincent Roy as Thennarasu's father (2017–2018)
 Varun Udhay as Thennarasu: Mutharasan's cousin (2017–2020)
 Sujatha as Thennarasu's mother (2017–2020)
 Ravi Varma as Thanikachalam: Neelambari's husband, biological father of Mutharasan and also father of Marudhu, Poongodhai, Janani and Karthick; he was killed by Swetha (2017–2018)
 Duraimani as Gowtham's cousin (2019–2020)
 "Soodhu Kavvum" Shivakumar as Karunakaran: Neelambari's brother, Swetha's father; killed by Chitra (2017–2018)
 Ravivarman as Natrajan: Thennarasu's brother; killed by Vennila (2017–2018)
 Sudha as Vennila's mother: killed by Swetha's father Karunakaran (2017–2018)
 Sumangali as Chithra's mother: killed by Neelambari and Swetha's father Karunakaran (2017–2018)
 Meenakshi as Vennila's grandmother: killed by Swetha's father Karunakaran (2017–2018)
 Suresh Krishnan as Pasupathi: the fake Ruthra's father (cameo)

Production

Launching
A first look for the series was officially released on 4 February 2017, together with the first look for Poove Poochudava.  Cast members from both shows were interviewed on Puthandu 14 April 2017 on the Chithirai Puthandu special programs hosted by Deepak Dinkar and Archana Chandhoke.

This horror-based love story was initially produced by V. Shankar Raman for K Studios. S. Sabreesh Kumar under Monk Studios took over the series in 2017 and continued producing the show till the series' end in 2021.

Casting
Popular Tamil TV actor Sanjeev was selected to portray the lead role as Mutharasan. In May he left the show because of an inconvenience of his role. Shreekumar replaced him in the role of Mutharasan from episode 271. Malayalam actress Nachathira made her TV acting debut with the series by playing Vennila. Chaitra was selected to portray the second leading role and main antagonist as Swetha. Fathima Babu joined the series as the main antagonist Neelambari and Yamuna Chinnadurai was selected to play Mutharasan's first wife who becomes a ghost. Besides Minnal Deepa, Barath, Aravindh Khathare, Vinitha and Surjith Ansary were added to the cast. The series features many new cast entries.

Reception

Broadcast history
In Zee Tamil series history, Yaaradi Nee Mohini is the first series to contain over a thousand episodes. Programming head Siju Prabhakaran, creator Tamil Daasan, producer Sabareesh Kumar, director Priyan and the entire team celebrated the special occasion.

Ratings
It became the fifth-most watched Tamil television programme in the years 2017 and 2018 with 9.220 million impressions. From week 1 to till now, it maintained top 10 positions in TRP chart rating for most watched Tamil television programs.
This Serial Became Popular and Listed At Top 5 Position In BARC Rating Charts after Shreekumar replaced Sanjeev.

Special and crossover episodes
 On 17 November 2019, Yaaradi Nee Mohini held a marriage function called Yaaradi Nee Mohini Kalyanam for one hour.
 Yaaradi Nee Mohini's cast and crew joined Maha Sangamam with the series "Gokulathil Seethai" from 3 August 2020 to 16 August 2020.
 On 22 January 2021, Yaaradi Nee Mohini held a three-hour Mega Episode focusing on Swetha's pregnancy.
 Yaaradi Nee Mohini cast and crew joined Maha Sangamam with the series "Gokulathil Seethai" for the second time from 15 to 28 February 2021.
 From 15 March to 21 March 2021, Yaaradi Nee Mohini held a one-hour prime-time special episode.
This series had a crossover with "Ooru Oorla Oru Rajakumari" called as Sadhanai Sangamam  from 1 August 2021 to 8 August 2021. This Sadhanai Sangamam is based on Climax of Yaaradi Nee Mohini and boost up the climax.
On 15 August 2021, A special show held for this series as Yaaradi Nee Mohini Vetri Vizha to celebrate its grand success and for crossing 1250 episodes.  
On 22 August 2021, this series held a two hour special episode for its climax.  
On 29 August 2021, For the first time, In history of Tamil Television, this series held a one hour special episode for its alternative climax.

Adaptations

Awards and nominations

References

External links
 
 Yaaradi Nee Mohini at ZEE5

Zee Tamil original programming
Tamil-language horror fiction television series
Tamil-language romance television series
Tamil-language thriller television series
2017 Tamil-language television series debuts
Tamil-language television shows
2021 Tamil-language television series endings
Television shows set in Tamil Nadu